Sucre, Sucre may refer to:

 Sucre, Sucre Department, Colombia
 Sucre Municipality, Sucre, Venezuela